Sergei Andreyevich Zabrodin (born 25 February 1998) is a Russian football player who plays as a midfielder.

Club career
He played his first game for the main squad of FC Rostov on 24 September 2015 in a Russian Cup game against FC Tosno.

References

External links
 
 Profile by Russian Professional Football League

1998 births
Sportspeople from Rostov-on-Don
Living people
Russian footballers
Association football midfielders
FC Rostov players
FC SKA Rostov-on-Don players
FC Ararat Moscow players
FC Inter Cherkessk players